An Elastic Affair (1930) is a 10-minute short comedy film directed by Alfred Hitchcock which features the two winners—Cyril Butcher (1909–1988) as "the Boy" and Aileen Despard (1908–1981) as "the Girl"—of a film acting scholarship sponsored by British film magazine Film Weekly.

The film was shown on 19 January 1930 at a ceremony at the London Palladium at which the two winners were presented with their award, in the form of movie contracts with the film producer John Maxwell of British International Pictures. The film is now considered a lost film.

See also
List of lost films

References

External links

Lost Films: An Elastic Affair
Where is Hitchcock's lost short? message board

1930 films
1930 comedy films
British black-and-white films
Films directed by Alfred Hitchcock
Lost British films
British comedy short films
1930 lost films
Lost comedy films
1930s English-language films
1930s British films